Act, formerly named National Reconstruction Party (PRN) and Christian Labour Party (PTC), is a political party in Brazil.

The party was founded in 1985 as the Youth Party (Partido da Juventude, PJ) by Daniel Tourinho, a Brazilian lawyer. In 1989 the party was renamed National Reconstruction Party. Fernando Collor de Mello represented the party in the 1989 Brazilian presidential election, the country's first direct election since the 1964 Brazilian coup d'état, which followed a redemocratization process started in the 1980s. Collor was elected president and took office in 1990. The party carried out a platform of encouraging free trade, opening Brazil's market to imports, privatizing state-run companies, and attempting to reduce Brazil's rampant hyperinflation by way of the Plano Collor (Collor Plan), which significantly reduced inflation rates in 1991, but was followed by a renewed and persistent, though smaller uptick in 1992. Inflation continued rising until the 1994 Plano Real.

Following the impeachment of Fernando Collor for corruption and influence peddling charges in 1992, the party lost suffered a deep confidence crisis, lost all federal representation  and eventually changed its name to Christian Labour Party (Partido Trabalhista Cristão, PTC) in 2000.

In 2016, Collor, elected senator in 2007, re-joined PTC, which thus regained federal parliamentary representation. He left in 2019 to join the Republican Party of the Social Order and PTC again lost representation.

In 2022, the party rebranded, changing its name to "Agir".

In 2022, the party supported the pre-candidacy of Lula da Silva for the 2022 Brazilian general election, joining the alliance Let's go together for Brazil. It remains allied with the Workers Party and other coalition members.

Electoral history

Legislative elections

Notes

References

External links
 (in Portuguese)

Conservative parties in Brazil
Political parties established in 1985
Liberal parties in Brazil
Social conservative parties
1985 establishments in Brazil
Labour parties